Moneta is a Roman goddess who was the personification of riches and wealth.

Moneta may also refer to:

Places
 Moneta, a neighborhood of Gardena, California
 Moneta, Iowa, United States
 Moneta, Virginia, United States

Species
 Moneta (moth), a genus of moth in the family Geometridae
 Moneta (spider), a genus of spider in the family Theridiidae
 Cypraea moneta, a marine gastropod

Other
 Moneta (name)